Gary Collier may refer to:
 Gary Collier (basketball) (born 1971), retired American basketball player
 Gary Collier (footballer) (born 1955), English former footballer